In Aztec mythology, Atlahua, Ahtlahua, Atlahoa, Atlavâ  or Atlaua  was a water God (the blue version of Tlaloc, the Tlaloc from the South), fisherman and archer. There were said to be at least four ancient Aztec temples at which he was worshiped, the tallest supposedly being over 200 feet tall (61 metres) . The Aztecs prayed to him when there were deaths in water, such as when Hernando Cortez conquered Tenochtitlan (the Ancient Aztec capital on a lake, now Mexico City), and the lake was said to be "floating with heads and corpses".

The original image appears in  General History of the Things of New Spain by Fray Bernardino de Sahagún: The Florentine Codex. Book II: The Ceremonies

References 

Aztec mythology and religion
Water deities